In enzymology, a FMN adenylyltransferase is an enzyme that catalyzes the chemical reaction

ATP + FMN  diphosphate + FAD

Thus, the two substrates of this enzyme are ATP and FMN, whereas its two products are diphosphate and FAD.

This enzyme belongs to the family of transferases, specifically those transferring phosphorus-containing nucleotide groups (nucleotidyltransferases).  The systematic name of this enzyme class is ATP:FMN adenylyltransferase. This enzyme participates in riboflavin metabolism.

Other names
Other names in common use include 
FAD pyrophosphorylase
riboflavin mononucleotide adenylyltransferase
adenosine triphosphate-riboflavin mononucleotide transadenylase
adenosine triphosphate-riboflavine mononucleotide transadenylase
FAD synthetase
riboflavin adenine dinucleotide pyrophosphorylase
riboflavine

References

 
 

EC 2.7.7
Enzymes of unknown structure